Agust D is the debut mixtape by the South Korean rapper of the same name, better known as Suga of boy band BTS. It was released on August 15, 2016 by Big Hit Entertainment on SoundCloud.

Background and development 
Prior to launching his career as the rapper Suga of South Korean boy band BTS, Agust D began writing music lyrics and working with MIDI at age 13 and held a part-time job composing and arranging music at a recording studio at age 17. Active under the name "Gloss" as an underground rapper, Agust D originally entered Big Hit Entertainment as a producer in 2010 and trained under Big Hit Entertainment for three years alongside members J-Hope and RM before making his debut as a member of BTS in 2013. In the initial years of his career in BTS, both he and his fellow group member RM faced criticism from the South Korean underground hip hop scene for "selling out" and becoming K-pop idols.

Between his commitments as a member of BTS, Agust D took advantage of time on the plane and in hotel rooms after concerts to continuously produce and compose music. In an interview for Grazia Korea, Agust D expressed a desire to release the music he wanted to do without having to consider popular appeal or music ranking. He intended to release his music for free in the form of a mixtape to avoid such considerations, commenting that an album "has a feeling of being trapped in some sort of framework" due to the need for company involvement in promotion and advertising. Developing Agust D musically on the base of hip hop, much of Agust D's inspiration for the lyrics came from his own stories of dream, youth, and reality.

In order to differentiate his work from that of his work as Suga, he developed the alter ego "Agust D", which is derived from the initials DT, short for his birthplace, Daegu Town, and "Suga" spelled backwards. Steadily accumulating songs in his career, Agust D utilized a number of songs composed as early as 2011 to as late as a month before release to create his mixtape. The release of Agust D followed RM's self-titled mixtape RM (2015) and the success of BTS' first compilation album The Most Beautiful Moment in Life: Young Forever (2016) and The Most Beautiful Moment in Life On Stage: Epilogue Tour.

Music and lyrics 
The final cut of Agust D comprises ten tracks on SoundCloud and eight tracks on streaming and download services. Critics viewed Agust D as a major departure from his previous catalog as a member of BTS with a hardcore rap style highlighting his underground influences. Billboard and Fuse complimented the album's divergence from his contemporaries in K-pop with its vulnerability and Agust D's self-production.

In Agust D, Agust D exposed his inner thoughts on his beginnings to his rise to stardom. "Intro ; Dt sugA", showcasing the style of classic turntablism hip hop, preceded the self-introduction track "Agust D" which utilized fast and precise rap techniques over "deep and intense bass" to underscore his confidence and self-identity. "Give It to Me" launched into "full-on disses" towards his detractors and the subsequent "Skit" explored the duality of Agust D and Suga "as a human being and as a musician". While "724148" reflected on the meaning of "success" and Agust D's beginnings in his hometown of Daegu, the track "140503 at Dawn", composed of minimal beats, reflected on his underlying vulnerability in the early morning before transitioning into the track "The Last" which utilized dramatic beats and rap techniques to portray his soul consumed by depression, obsession, and self-hatred following the pursuit of his dream in Seoul. In "Tony Montana", Agust D took on the character of Tony Montana from the 1983 film Scarface to ruminate on the nature of success, ambition, and envy. The lyrics of "Interlude: Dream, Reality" consisted of only the word "dream", leading into the final track "So Far Away" which reflected on the essence of the word "dream" while urging his listeners to continue dreaming.

Release and commercial performance 

On July 29, 2016, Agust D's release date was confirmed to be in August. On August 15, it was released on SoundCloud and for free download via links on Twitter in conjunction with a music video for "Agust D". On August 18, Agust D released a follow-up music video for "Give It to Me". Aside from interviewing for Grazia Korea and Marie Claire Korea, Agust D did not further promote the mixtape. Fuse later ranked it at #16 on their list of the 20 best mixtapes of 2016.

In February 2018, the mixtape was rereleased for digital purchase and streaming sans its first two tracks. The reissue reached #3 on Billboards World Albums Chart, #5 on the Heatseekers Albums chart, and #74 on the Top Album Sales chart. The rerelease also caused Agust D to reach #46 on the Emerging Artists chart for the week of March 3.

 Track listing 
Only the Soundcloud version of the album includes "Intro : DT sugA" and "Agust D", while other platforms start the album from "give it to me".Sample credits'

 "Intro: Dt sugA" and "Agust D" contain a sample of "It's a Man's Man's Man's World" as performed by James Brown.

Personnel 
The following people are credited on the album:

Musicians
 Agust D – keyboard , synthesizer , gang vocal 
 Dj Friz – scratch 
 RM – gang vocal 
 J-Hope – gang vocal 
 Pdogg – synthesizer , gang vocal , keyboard 
 정수완 – guitar 
 June – rhythm programming 
 Supreme Boi – keyboard 
 Slow Rabbit – synthesizer , keyboard 
 Suran – chorus 
 Jungkook – chorus

Technical and production

 Agust D – producer , recording engineer 
 Alex DeYoung – mastering engineer 
 Dj Friz – recording engineer 
 Pdogg – recording engineer , mix engineer 
 Yang Ga – mix engineer 
 김보성 – mix engineer 
 Supreme Boi – producer 
 Slow Rabbit – producer 
 정우영 – recording engineer

Release history

References 

2016 mixtape albums
Debut mixtape albums